Scrobipalpa suaedicola is a moth in the family Gelechiidae. It was described by Paul Mabille in 1906. It is found in Spain, southern France, Croatia and on Sardinia and Madeira.

The larvae feed on Suaeda vera.

References

Scrobipalpa
Moths described in 1906